Something Better may refer to:

"Something Better" (Marianne Faithfull song), 1968 song
"Something Better" (Softengine song), 2014 Finnish Eurovision entry
"Something Better" (Audien song), a 2015 song featuring Lady Antebellum
"Something Better", song from Natalie Imbruglia from album Left of the Middle written by Imbruglia, Boo Hewerdine, Thornalley
"Something Better", single by Martin Solveig
"Something Better" a single by Flyleaf from their 2013 EP Who We Are

”Something Better”, a song from the 1996 film ‘’Muppet Treasure Island’’